Harry Morgan (born Harry Bratsberg; April 10, 1915 – December 7, 2011) was an American actor and director whose television and film career spanned six decades. Morgan's major roles included Pete Porter in both December Bride (1954–1959) and Pete and Gladys (1960–1962); Officer Bill Gannon on Dragnet (1967–1970); Amos Coogan on Hec Ramsey (1972–1974); and his starring role as Colonel Sherman T. Potter in M*A*S*H (1975–1983) and AfterMASH (1983–1985). Morgan also appeared as a supporting player in more than 100 films.

Early life and career
Morgan was born Harry Bratsberg in Detroit, the son of Hannah and Henry Bratsberg. His parents were of Swedish and Norwegian ancestry. In his interview with the Archive of American Television, Morgan spelled his Norwegian family surname as "Brasburg". Many sources, however, including some family records, list the spelling as "Bratsburg". According to one source, when Morgan's father Henry registered at junior high school, "the registrar spelled it Brasburg instead of Bratsberg. Bashful Henry did not demur."

Morgan was raised in Muskegon, Michigan, and graduated from Muskegon High School in 1933, where he achieved distinction as a statewide debating champion. He originally aspired to a J.D. degree, but began acting while a junior at the University of Chicago in 1935.

He began acting on stage under his birth name, in 1937, joining the Group Theatre in New York City formed by Harold Clurman, Cheryl Crawford, and Lee Strasberg in 1931. He appeared in the original production of the Clifford Odets play Golden Boy, followed by a host of successful Broadway roles alongside such other Group members as Lee J. Cobb, Elia Kazan, John Garfield, Sanford Meisner, and Karl Malden. Morgan also did summer stock at the Pine Brook Country Club located in the countryside of Nichols, Connecticut.

Film work

Morgan made his screen debut (originally using the name "Henry Morgan") in the 1942 movie To the Shores of Tripoli. His screen name later became "Henry 'Harry' Morgan" and eventually Harry Morgan, to avoid confusion with the popular humorist of the same name.

In the same year, Morgan appeared in the movie Orchestra Wives as a young man pushing his way to the front of a ballroom crowd with his date to hear Glenn Miller's band play. A few years later, still credited as Henry Morgan, he was cast in the role of pianist Chummy MacGregor in the 1954 biopic The Glenn Miller Story.

Morgan continued to play a number of significant roles on the big screen in such films as The Ox-Bow Incident (1943) with Henry Fonda, Wing and a Prayer (1944), A Bell for Adano (1945), State Fair (1945), Dragonwyck (1946) with Walter Huston, The Gangster (1947), The Big Clock (1948) with Charles Laughton, The Well (1951), High Noon (1952) with Gary Cooper and Grace Kelly, Torch Song (1953) with Joan Crawford, and several films in the 1950s for director Anthony Mann starring James Stewart, including Bend of the River (1952), Thunder Bay (1953), The Glenn Miller Story (1954), The Far Country (1955), and Strategic Air Command (1955). In his later film career, he appeared in Inherit the Wind (1960) with Spencer Tracy and Fredric March, How the West Was Won (1962) (as Ulysses S. Grant) with John Wayne, John Goldfarb, Please Come Home! (1965) with Peter Ustinov, Frankie and Johnny (1966) with Elvis Presley and Donna Douglas, The Flim-Flam Man (1967) with George C. Scott, Support Your Local Sheriff! (1969) with James Garner, Support Your Local Gunfighter (1971) also with James Garner, Snowball Express (1972) with Keenan Wynn, The Shootist (1976) with John Wayne and Lauren Bacall, The Wild Wild West Revisited (1979) with Robert Conrad, and as Captain Gannon in the theatrical film version of Dragnet (1987) with Dan Aykroyd and Tom Hanks.

Radio and television
Morgan hosted the NBC radio series Mystery in the Air starring Peter Lorre in 1947. On CBS, he played Pete Porter in Pete and Gladys (1960–1962), with Cara Williams as wife Gladys. Pete and Gladys was a spin-off of December Bride (1954–1959), starring Spring Byington, a show in which Morgan had a popular recurring role. In 1950, Morgan appeared as an obtrusive, alcohol-addled hotel clerk in the Dragnet radio episode "The Big Boys".

1960s: Dragnet and other roles

After Pete and Gladys ended production, Morgan guest-starred in the role of Al Everett in the 1962 episode "Like My Own Brother" on Gene Kelly's ABC drama series, Going My Way, loosely based on the 1944 Bing Crosby film of the same name. That same year, he played the mobster Bugs Moran in an episode of ABC's The Untouchables, with Robert Stack. In 1963, he was cast as Sheriff Ernie Backwater on Richard Boone's Have Gun – Will Travel Western series on CBS, then worked as a regular cast member on the 1963–64 anthology series The Richard Boone Show.

In the 1964–1965 season, Morgan co-starred as Seldom Jackson in the 26-week NBC comedy/drama Kentucky Jones, starring Dennis Weaver, formerly of Gunsmoke.

Morgan is even more widely recognized as Officer Bill Gannon, Joe Friday's partner in the revived version of Dragnet (1967–1970).

Morgan had also appeared with Dragnet star Jack Webb in three film noir movies, Dark City (1950), Appointment with Danger (1951) and Pete Kelly's Blues (1955), and was an early regular member of Jack Webb's stock company of actors on the original Dragnet radio show. Morgan later worked on two other shows for Webb: 1971's The D.A. and the 1972–1974 Western series, Hec Ramsey. Morgan also appeared in four episodes of Gunsmoke ("The Witness" – aired 11/23/1970, "Milligan" - aired 11/6/72, "The Wiving" - aired 10/14/1974 and "Brides and Grooms", sequel to The Wiving - aired 2/10/1975).

Morgan appeared in the role of Inspector Richard Queen, uncle of Ellery Queen in the 1971 television film Ellery Queen: Don't Look Behind You.

1970s: M*A*S*H

Morgan's first appearance on M*A*S*H was in the show's third season (1974–1975), when he played the mentally unbalanced Major General Bartford Hamilton Steele in "The General Flipped at Dawn", which first aired on September 10, 1974.

The following season, Morgan joined the cast of M*A*S*H as Colonel Sherman T. Potter. A fan of the sitcom, Morgan replaced McLean Stevenson, who left the show at the end of the previous season. Unlike Stevenson's character Henry Blake, Potter was a career Army officer who was a firm yet good-humored, caring father figure to those under his command.

In 1980, Morgan won an Emmy Award for his performance on M*A*S*H. When asked if he was a better actor after working with the show's talented cast, Morgan responded, "I don't know about that, but it's made me a better human being." After the end of the series, Morgan reprised the Potter role in a short-lived spinoff series, AfterMASH.

Morgan also appeared in several Disney movies throughout the decade, including The Barefoot Executive, Snowball Express, Charley and the Angel, The Apple Dumpling Gang, The Cat from Outer Space (opposite McLean Stevenson) and The Apple Dumpling Gang Rides Again.

Later years
In 1986, he co-starred with Hal Linden in Blacke's Magic, a show about a magician who doubled as a detective solving unusual crimes. One season was made. Morgan's character, Leonard Blacke, was a semiretired con artist.

In 1987, Morgan reprised his Bill Gannon character, now a captain, for a supporting role in another film version of Dragnet, a parody and homage to the original series written by and starring Dan Aykroyd and costarring Tom Hanks and Christopher Plummer.

In 1987–1988, Morgan starred in the one-season situation comedy series You Can't Take It with You as family patriarch Martin Vanderhof.

In the 1990s, Morgan starred alongside Walter Matthau in a series of television movies for CBS as Stoddard Bell, a judge who is an acquaintance/nemesis/partner of Matthau's Harmon Cobb, an attorney (The Incident; An Incident in Baltimore, and Incident in a Small Town). He also lent his voice to an episode of The Simpsons from season seven, where he once again played Bill Gannon; in the episode "Mother Simpson", Gannon and Joe Friday (voiced by Harry Shearer) are FBI agents trying to track down Homer's mother, who is a fugitive from justice.

Morgan also had a recurring role on 3rd Rock from the Sun as Professor Suter, a colleague of Dick Solomon's. Morgan directed episodes for several TV series, including two episodes of The Alfred Hitchcock Hour, two episodes of Hec Ramsey, one episode of Adam-12, and eight episodes of M*A*S*H. Morgan had a guest role on The Jeff Foxworthy Show as Raymond and a guest role on Grace Under Fire as Jean's pot-smoking boyfriend.

In 2006, Morgan was inducted into the Hall of Great Western Performers at the National Cowboy & Western Heritage Museum in Oklahoma City, Oklahoma.

Personal life
Morgan's first marriage was to Eileen Detchon from 1940 until her death in 1985. During Morgan's time on M*A*S*H, a photograph of Detchon regularly appeared on the desk of his character. A drawing of a horse, seen on the wall behind Potter's desk, was drawn by Morgan's grandson, Jeremy Morgan. In addition, Eileen was the name of the wife of Officer Bill Gannon on Dragnet. Morgan had four sons with his first wife: Christopher, Charles, Paul, and Daniel (who died in 1989).

He then married Barbara Bushman Quine (granddaughter of silent film star Francis X. Bushman) on December 17, 1986. The marriage lasted until his death. In July 1996, he was arrested on domestic battery charges for striking his wife Barbara which caused her to be admitted to the hospital. The case was later dismissed.

Morgan had two siblings, Marguerite and Arnold (both deceased).

Morgan was close friends with bandleader Glenn Miller, whom he met while filming Orchestra Wives in 1942, until Miller's death two years later. Morgan was later cast in the 1954 movie about his friend, The Glenn Miller Story, playing Chummy MacGregor.

Death
Morgan died peacefully in his sleep at 3:00 a.m. local time in Los Angeles, on December 7, 2011, at the age of 96. His son, Charles, said he recently had been treated for pneumonia. His body was cremated and his remains were given to his family.

Following Morgan's death, Mike Farrell, who played B.J. Hunnicutt opposite Morgan in M*A*S*H, released a statement:

Filmography

Films 

To the Shores of Tripoli (1942) as Mouthy
The Loves of Edgar Allan Poe (1942) as Ebenezer Burling
The Omaha Trail (1942) as Henchman Nat
Orchestra Wives (1942) as Cully Anderson
Crash Dive (1943) as Brownie
The Ox-Bow Incident (1943) as Art Croft
Happy Land (1943) as Anton 'Tony' Cavrek
The Eve of St. Mark (1944) as Pvt. Shevlin
Roger Touhy, Gangster (1944) as Thomas J. 'Smoke' Reardon
Wing and a Prayer (1944) as Ens. Malcolm Brainard
Gentle Annie (1944) as Cottonwood Goss
A Bell for Adano (1945) as Capt. N. Purvis
State Fair (1945) as Barker
From This Day Forward (1946) as Hank Beesley
Johnny Comes Flying Home (1946) as Joe Patillo
Dragonwyck (1946) as Klaas Bleecker
Somewhere in the Night (1946) as Bath Attendant (uncredited)
It Shouldn't Happen to a Dog (1946) as Gus Rivers
Crime Doctor's Man Hunt (1946) as Jervis (uncredited)
The Gangster (1947) as Shorty
The Big Clock (1948) as Bill Womack
All My Sons (1948) as Frank Lubey
Race Street (1948) as Hal Towers
The Saxon Charm (1948) as Hermy
Moonrise (1948) as Billy Scripture
Yellow Sky (1948) as Half Pint
Down to the Sea in Ships (1949) as Britton
The Beautiful Blonde from Bashful Bend (1949) as Hoodlum (uncredited)
Madame Bovary (1949) as Hyppolite
Strange Bargain (1949) as Lt. Richard Webb
Red Light (1949) as Rocky
Holiday Affair (1949) as Police Lieutenant
Hello Out There (1949) as The Young Gambler
Outside the Wall (1950) as Garth
The Showdown (1950) as Rod Main
Dark City (1950) as Soldier
Belle Le Grand (1951) as Abel Stone
When I Grow Up (1951) as Father Reed (modern)
Appointment with Danger (1951) as George Soderquist
The Highwayman (1951) as Tim
The Well (1951) as Claude Packard
The Blue Veil (1951) as Charles Hall
Boots Malone (1952) as Quarter Horse Henry
Scandal Sheet (1952) as Biddle
Bend of the River (1952) as Shorty
My Six Convicts (1952) as Dawson
High Noon (1952) as Sam Fuller
What Price Glory? (1952) as Sgt. Moran (uncredited)
Big Jim McLain (1952) as Narrator (voice, uncredited)
Apache War Smoke (1952) as Ed Cotten
Toughest Man in Arizona (1952) as Verne Kimber
Stop, You're Killing Me (1952) as Innocence
Thunder Bay (1953) as Rawlings
Arena (1953) as Lew Hutchins
Champ for a Day (1953) as Al Muntz
Torch Song (1953) as Joe Denner
The Glenn Miller Story (1954) as Chummy
Prisoner of War (1954) as Maj. O.D. Hale
The Forty-Niners (1954) as Alf Billings
About Mrs. Leslie (1954) as Fred Blue
The Far Country (1954) as Ketchum
Strategic Air Command (1955) as Sgt. Bible (flight engineer)
Not as a Stranger (1955) as Oley
Pete Kelly's Blues (1955) (uncredited)
The Bottom of the Bottle (1956) as Felix – Barkeep
Backlash (1956) as Tony Welker
Operation Teahouse (1956) as Himself
UFO (1956) as "Red Dog 1" (voice)
Star in the Dust (1956) as Lew Hogan
The Teahouse of the August Moon (1956) as Sgt. Gregovich
Under Fire (1957) as Sgt. Joseph C. Dusak
It Started with a Kiss (1959) as Charles Meriden
The Mountain Road (1960) as Sgt. 'Mike' Michaelson
Inherit the Wind (1960) as Judge Mel Coffey
Cimarron (1960) as Jesse Rickey
How the West Was Won (1962) as Gen. Ulysses S. Grant
John Goldfarb, Please Come Home (1965) as Secretary of State Deems Sarajevo
Frankie and Johnny (1966) as Cully
What Did You Do in the War, Daddy? (1966) as Maj. Pott
The Flim-Flam Man (1967) as Sheriff Slade
Star Spangled Salesman (1968) as TV Cop
Support Your Local Sheriff! (1969) as Olly Perkins
Viva Max! (1969) as Chief of Police Sylvester
The Barefoot Executive (1971) as E.J. Crampton
Support Your Local Gunfighter! (1971) as Taylor
Scandalous John (1971) as Sheriff Pippin
Snowball Express (1972) as Jesse McCord
Charley and the Angel (1973) as The Angel formerly Roy Zerney
The Apple Dumpling Gang (1975) as Homer McCoy
The Shootist (1976) as Marshall Thibido
Maneaters Are Loose! (1978) as Toby Waites
The Cat from Outer Space (1978) as General Stilton
The Apple Dumpling Gang Rides Again (1979) as Maj. T.P. Gaskill
The Wild Wild West Revisited (TV, 1979) as Robert T. Malone
More Wild Wild West (TV, 1980) as Robert T. Malone
Scout's Honor (TV, 1980) as Mr. Briggs
The Flight of Dragons (1982) as Carolinus (voice)
Sparkling Cyanide (TV, 1983) as Captain Kemp
Dragnet (1987) as Gannon
14 Going on 30 (TV, 1988) as Uncle Herb
The Incident (TV, 1990) as Judge Bell
Against Her Will: An Incident in Baltimore (TV, 1992) as Judge Bell
Incident in a Small Town (TV, 1994) as Judge Bell
Wild Bill: Hollywood Maverick (1996)
Family Plan (1997) as Sol Rubins
Crosswalk (1999) as Dr. Chandler

TV 
Have Gun Will Travel (1958) A Snare for Murder as Fred Braus; American Primitive (1963) as Sheriff Ernie Backwater
Alfred Hitchcock Presents (1959) Episode 159 Anniversary Gift as Hermie Jenkins
The Untouchables (1962) Episode 100 Double Cross as George Bugs Moran
Pete and Gladys (1960–1962)
Dragnet (1967–1971)
M*A*S*H (1975--1983)
The Bastard (TV miniseries, 1978) as Capt. Caleb
The Love Boat (1978)
Backstairs at the White House (TV miniseries, 1979) as President Harry S. Truman
Murder, She Wrote (1987) Season 3, Episode 21 "The Days Dwindle Down" as Retired Lt. Richard Webb
You Can't Take It with You (1987–1988) as Martin Vanderhof
The Simpsons (1995) Episode 136 "Mother Simpson" as Bill Gannon
3rd Rock from the Sun (1996) as Professor Suter

References

External links

 
 
 
 
 

1915 births
2011 deaths
American people of Scandinavian descent
20th-century American male actors
American male film actors
American male stage actors
American male television actors
American people of Norwegian descent
American people of Swedish descent
American television directors
Television personalities from Los Angeles
California Democrats
Deaths from pneumonia in California
Male actors from Detroit
Male actors from Los Angeles
Male Western (genre) film actors
Outstanding Performance by a Supporting Actor in a Comedy Series Primetime Emmy Award winners
People from Muskegon, Michigan
University of Chicago alumni